Apollonia was a town on the frontiers of ancient Aetolia and Phocis near Naupactus. Stephanus of Byzantium connects this Apollonia with Homeric Cyparissus.

See also
 List of ancient Greek cities

References

Populated places in ancient Aetolia
Populated places in ancient Phocis
Former populated places in Greece
Lost ancient cities and towns